Vadi, in both Hindustani classical music and Carnatic music, is the tonic (root) swara (musical note) of a given raga (musical scale). "Vadi is the most sonant or most important note of a Raga."  It does not refer to the most played note but it rather refers to a note of special significance.
It is usually the swara which is repeated the greatest number of times, and often it is the swara on which the singer can pause for a significant time. Vadi swara in a raga is like a king in a kingdom. The specialty of any raaga depends on vadi swara and because of this, the vadi swara is also called the Jeeva swara or the Ansha swara. A good artist uses vadi swara in different ways like singing vaadi swara again and again, starting a raga with vadi swara, to end a raaga with vadi swara, singing vadi swara many times in important places with different swaras or sometime singing vadi swara for a longer time in one breath.

Vadi swara is also helpful to identify the appropriate time for singing or playing a raga. If the vadi swara of a raaga is from the purvanga part of the saptak i.e. “Sa Re Ga Ma”, then it is called purvanga vaadi raaga and usually the time for singing or playing purvanga vaadi raagas is from noon to midnight. For example, ragas like Bhimpalasi, Pilu, Purvi, Marwa, Yaman, Bhoopali, and Bageshree etc. have purvanga vadi swara and so the time for singing and playing these ragas is from noon to midnight.

In the same way, if the vaadi swara of a raaga is from the utranga part of the saptak i.e. “Ma Pa Dha Ni” then it is classed as a utraanga vaadi raaga and the time for singing or playing utraanga vaadi ragas is from midnight to noon. For example, ragas in Hindustani classical music like Bhairav, Bhairavi, Bilawal, Kalingada, Sohini, and Asavari etc. have utraanga vaadi swara and so the time for singing or playing these ragas is between midnight to noon.

Vaadi swara, along with the Samavadi swara of a raga, usually brings out the uniqueness of the raga and its bhaava (mood) and rasa (emotion).

Etymology and Concept

Structure

Tonal Hierarchy

Relation to Raga

References 

Hindustani music theory
Carnatic music
Carnatic music terminology
Hindustani music terminology